Anna Alexandrovna Morgina (born 21 August 1991) is an inactive Russian tennis player.

Morgina has career-high WTA rankings of 316 in singles, achieved on 2 October 2017, and 165 in doubles, set on 14 November 2016. She has won 13 singles titles and 39 doubles titles on the ITF Women's Circuit.

Morgina made her main-draw debut on the WTA Tour in the doubles event of the 2015 Baku Cup, partnering Valentyna Ivakhnenko.

ITF Circuit finals

Singles: 28 (13 titles, 15 runner–ups)

Doubles: 67 (39 titles, 28 runner–ups)

External links
 
 

Russian female tennis players
1991 births
Living people
Tennis players from Moscow
20th-century Russian women
21st-century Russian women